Veronika Preining-Breuer (born 21 November 1965) is an Austrian Paralympic skier. She represented Austria in Para-Alpine skiing at the 1984 Paralympic Winter Games in Innsbruck and in Nordic skiing at the 1988 Paralympic Winter Games in Innsbruck. She won six medals, two gold, three silvers and a bronze.

Career 
At the 1984 Paralympic Winter Games in Innsbruck, she finished first in downhill in 2: 06.14 ( Sheila Holzworth finished the race in 2: 32.42 and Cara Dunne in 2:36.93). She won a silver medal in super combined B1 (with a realized time of 2:44.63), and bronze in the giant slalom race category B1 in 6:15.91.

At the 1988 Winter Paralympics, she won gold in the 5 km race in front of the Finnish athlete Kirsti Pennanen and the Russian Valentina Grigoryeva, the silver in the 10 km race, and the bronze in the 3x5 km event in category B1-3.

She competed at the 1990 World Nordic disabled championships, winning a gold medal, in 10 kilometers.

References 

1965 births
Living people
Paralympic alpine skiers of Austria
Paralympic cross-country skiers of Austria
Austrian female alpine skiers
Austrian female cross-country skiers
Alpine skiers at the 1984 Winter Paralympics
Cross-country skiers at the 1988 Winter Paralympics
Cross-country skiers at the 1988 Winter Olympics
Medalists at the 1984 Winter Paralympics
Medalists at the 1988 Winter Paralympics
Paralympic gold medalists for Austria
Paralympic silver medalists for Austria
Paralympic bronze medalists for Austria
20th-century Austrian women